FOB Edinburgh was an International Security Assistance Force (ISAF) Forward Operating Base (FOB) operated by both the British Armed Forces and United States Armed Forces and located in Musa Qala District, Helmand Province, Afghanistan.

The base was used under Operation Herrick (OP H).

It was also seen in the episode "Joining the Royal Irish Regiment" where Ross Kemp spends time at the base as well as with the soldiers out in the field.

History

British units

It has been used by:
 OP H VII - 52nd Infantry Brigade (December 2007 - March 2008)
 OP H VIII - 16 Air Assault Brigade (March 2008 - September 2008)
 OP H IX - 3 Commando Brigade (October 2008 - April 2009)
 OP H X - 19th Light Brigade (April 2009 - October 2009)
 OP H XI - 11 Light Brigade (October 2009 - April 2010)
 2nd Battalion, Royal Gurkha Rifles

American units
 1st Battalion, 2nd Marines
 Alpha Battery, 1st Battalion, 11th Marines 
 Lima Battery, 3rd Battalion 11th Marines from May 2010 to November 2011.
 Charlie Battery, 1st Battalion 10th Marines, November 2010 - May 2011
 Kilo Battery, 3rd Battalion 10th Marines, Regimental Combat Team 7 from March 2010 to May 2010 (First American unit on the base and took control of it from the British). 
 2nd Battalion 5th Marines, Regimental Combat Team 5 during June 2012.
 IMA Detachment, 1st Maintenance Battalion (-) (Reinforced), 1st Marine Logistics Group (Forward) during 2012.
 Charlie Company, 1-214th Aviation Regiment, "Weizen Dust-Off" from December 2010 to August 2011.
 Weapons Company, H&S Company, 2nd Battalion 5th Marines from March 2012 to September 2012 when the base was torn down.

See also
List of ISAF installations in Afghanistan
Ross Kemp in Afghanistan

References

Military bases of the United Kingdom in Afghanistan